Košarkaški klub Gorica, commonly referred to as KK Gorica or simply Gorica, is a men's professional basketball club based in Velika Gorica, Croatia. The club competes in the ABA League Second Division and the Croatian League.

History 
The club's greatest success so far came when they got promoted to the Croatian League after winning the 2nd-tier league in 2014.

Players

Current roster

Coaches

Notable former players
 Mario Kasun
 Robert Troha
 Ivica Zubac
 Ante Žižić

External links

KK Gorica
Basketball teams in Croatia
Basketball teams established in 1969
Basketball teams in Yugoslavia